Roman Jebavý and Matwé Middelkoop were the defending champions, but lost in the final to Matteo Berrettini and Fabio Fognini, 6–7(6–8), 6–7(4–7).

Seeds

Draw

References
 Main Draw

St. Petersburg Open - Doubles
St. Petersburg Open